Serranía de la Macarena is an isolated mountain range located in the Meta Department, Colombia. It was named after the Virgin of Hope of Macarena. The highest peak ("El Gobernador", the governor)  reaches  and is the highest point of the Orinoquía Region. The first national reserve in Colombia was established in the central part of the mountain range in accordance with a Congressional Law promulgated in 1948. The status of National Natural Park was designated in 1971 and the protected area encompasses .

Biodiversity

The national park encompasses the ecologically unique meeting point for the flora and fauna of the Amazon, Orinoco and Andes regions. The area is of tropical climate and temperatures range from 42 °F (5.5 °C) to 88 °F (31 °C).  These aspects help to maintain a high level of biodiversity with numerous endemic and rare species.

The ecosystems found within the park include rainforest, dry forest, shrublands and savanna.  The mountains are home to around 50 known species of orchids, and botanists studying the area have identified more than 2,400 other species of plants. Of those, over 400 can also be found in the Orinoquía subregions. The plants in the Macarena have even less overlap with the 8,000 species in the Amazon subregions.

The ecosystem's fauna includes anteaters, jaguars, cougars, deer, 8 species of monkeys, 500 species of birds including the gray-legged tinamou, 1,200 species of insects and 100 species of reptiles.

Ecotourism
The La Macarena National and Ecological Reserve Park is internationally known for the Caño Cristales, known by people who has visited it as one of the most beautiful rivers in the world.

The park also contains petroglyphs from ancient cultures (Angosturas I and II petroglyphs in the Guayabero River). There are also enormous waterfalls, such as Caño Canoas, El Salto de Yarumales, El Salto del Mico, Soplaculos and others. Most of them are difficult to reach on foot due to the rugged terrain.

Just outside of the city of La Macarena are the Botanical Gardens of La Macarena, a place that offer the possibility of nature tourism involving its visitors in restoration activities.

Geology

Basement rocks on the east side of the Macarenas include the Precambrian granite of the Guyana Shield in the Guaviare River valley and the San Jose del Guaviare area. The rocks of the shield are overlain by sandstones and conglomerates of the Vaupes Formation of Lower Paleozoic to the lower Oligocene age.

References

External links 
  La Macarena National Park
  "The colonization of La Macarena Ecological Reserve" - Online book of the Colombian Luis Ángel Arango Library
  Sistema de Información Ambiental Territorial de la Amazonia colombiana SIAT-AC

Mountain ranges of Colombia
National parks of Colombia
Protected areas established in 1948